The Worker-Peasant Red Guards (WPRG), also translated as Workers and Peasants' Red Militia (WPRM), is a paramilitary force in North Korea. It is the largest civil defense force in North Korea. It was established on 14 January 1959 by Kim Il-sung and is not only under State Affairs Commission (until 2016 National Defense Commission) and Ministry of Defense control, but is also attached to the Workers' Party of Korea under its Military Leadership Department. It is thus responsible to the Supreme Leader in his capacity as Supreme  Commander of the Armed Forces.

The militia is organized on a provincial/City and town/village level, and structured on a brigade, battalion, company, and platoon basis. The militia maintains infantry small arms, with some mortars, field guns and anti-aircraft guns and even modernized older equipment such as multiple rocket launchers like the BM-13 and older Ural D-62 motorcycles, although some units are unarmed indicating status as logistics and medical units. Its strength is estimated at 5 million personnel.

Equipment

See also
 Korean People's Army

Other nations:
Red Guards (Russia) (Soviet Union)
China Militia (China)
Combat Groups of the Working Class (East Germany)
Workers' Militia (Hungarian People's Republic)
Volunteer Reserve of the Citizens' Militia (People's Republic of Poland)
People's Militias (Czechoslovakia)
Patriotic Guards (Romania)
Territorial Defence (SFR Yugoslavia)
Colectivo (Venezuela)
Committees for the Defense of the Revolution (Cuba)

References

Military wings of communist parties
Law enforcement in North Korea
Military of North Korea
Workers' Party of Korea